Kate York (born 1976 or 1977) is a singer-songwriter known for her work on the TV show Nashville.

Music career 
Born in southern California, York moved to Nashville, Tennessee, in 1999.

York has been part of several bands, including Skyline Motel (with Sarah Buxton, Daniel Tashian, and Ian Fitchuk) and Thompson, York & Nash (with Leigh Nash and Megan Thompson).

York has co-written songs for and with a number of recording artists, including Jonny Diaz, Fall Out Boy, Foreigner, Mat Kearney, Lady A, and Little Big Town. She secured sync placements in TV series such as Atypical, Batwoman, Grey's Anatomy, and Virgin River and films such as After, New Years Eve, and Wild Rose.

York achieved notoriety through her contribution of nearly twenty songs to the TV series Nashville. One of her songs, "Nothing in This World Will Ever Break My Heart Again" (co-written with Sarah Buxton), received a Primetime Emmy Award nomination for Outstanding Original Music and Lyrics. The nomination was pulled, however, because the song was not written for a show character, which was one of the nomination requirements.

York's most critically acclaimed song (as of December 2021) is "Glasgow (No Place Like Home)" (co-written with Mary Steenburgen and Caitlyn Smith), which was featured in the 2018 film Wild Rose. The song made the Oscar short list and received best original song nominations from the Chicago Indie Critics Awards, the Gold Derby Awards, the Guild of Music Supervisors, the Latino Entertainment Journalists Association, Music City Film Critics' Association, and the Online Film & Television Association. It won the 2020 best original song award from the Awards Circuit Community Awards, Critics Choice Movies Awards, Denver Film Critics Society, Georgia Film Critics Association, Hollywood Critics Association, Houston Film Critics Society, International Online Cinema Awards, and the North Dakota Film Society.

Song Credits on Nashville 
“All We Ever Wanted” (co-writer with Matraca Berg)

"Anywhere From Here" (co-writer with Sarah Buxton and Sarah Siskind)

“Believing” (co-writer with Tami Hinesh and Emily Shackelton)

“Breathe In” (co-writer with Allen Salmon and Andrew Combs)

“Everything I’ll Ever Need” (co-writer with Dylan Altman)

"For Your Glory" (co-writer with Leeland Mooring and Jack Mooring)

“Heart on Fire” (co-writer with Sarah Buxton and Blair Daly)

"I Will Fall" (co-writer with Tyler James)

"I Will Never Let You Know" (co-writer with Erin McCarley and Kevin Rhoads)

“Keep Asking Why (co-writer with Erin McCarley)

“Little Fire” (co-writer with Sarah Buxton and Lennon Stella)

"The Night Is Still Young" (co-writer with Sarah Siskind)

"Nothing in This World Will Ever Break My Heart Again" (co-writer with Sarah Buxton)

“One Works Better” (co-writer with Tofer Brown, Rosi Golan, and Natalie Hemby)

"Stronger Than Me" (co-writer with Sara Buxton)

“Trouble Is” (co-writer with Marv Green)

"Your Love Keeps Me Alive" (co-writer with Sarah Siskind)

Other Song Credits 
"Bad Guy" (co-writer with Mindy Smith and Betsy Roo)

"Breakaway" (co-writer with Lennon Stella and Jarryd James)

"Can't Go Back" (co-writer with Natalie Hemby and Rosi Golan)

"Christmas for Two" (co-writer with Leigh Nash)

"Church" (co-writer with Fall Out Boy, Audra Mae, and Andrew Wells)

"Eternal Gifts"

"Give My Life for Love" (co-writer with Mick Jones, Marti Frederiksen, and Cliff Downs)

"Glasgow (No Place Like Home)" (co-writer with Mary Steenburgen and Caitlyn Smith)

"More Beautiful You" (co-writer with Jonny Diaz)

"On & On" (co-writer with Mat Kearney)

"Smoking Your Weed" (co-writer with Lucie Silvas and Josh Osborne)

"Strong and Silent" (co-writer with Kree Harrison and Fancy Hagood)

"The Thing That Wrecks You" (co-writer with Daniel Tashian and Tenille Townes)

Albums 
Kate York (2004)

Sadlylove (2006)

For You (2008)

Fly Away (2011)

New (2012)

Kate York and Joe Pisapia (2016)

Out of My Head (2019)

Photography 
York is also a photographer. She and Sonya Jasinski produced the book Nashville: Behind the Curtain, which included candid photographs of the people and place of the Music City.

References 

1970s births
Living people
Year of birth uncertain
American women singer-songwriters
Musicians from Nashville, Tennessee
American women photographers
Musicians from California